Asteia amoena is a species of fly in the family Asteiidae. It is found in the  Palearctic .

References

External links
Images representing Asteia  amoena at BOLD

Asteiidae
Insects described in 1830
Muscomorph flies of Europe